Village Drums of Freedom are free improvisation percussion band founded in 1969 by Trinidadian drummer Gerald Achee. As of 2012 VDOF consists of more than a hundred jembe players all over the world. Most of them are members of Rastafari Movement. Village Drums of Freedom are Calypso band. Every year they play a leading part in the Trinidad and Tobago Carnival. In 2003 VDOF released an album Historic travel: cultural rhythms.

See also 
Polyrhythm
Djembe
Improvisation

References

External links
 Village Drums of Freedom official Soundcloud account

Calypso musical groups
Djembe players
Free improvisation ensembles
Percussion ensembles
Performers of Rastafarian music
Trinidad and Tobago drummers